Mila Jam is an American transgender singer, songwriter, dancer, actress and LGBTQ activist.

Early life and education 
Jahmila Adderley, known as Mila Jam, was born in Aurora, Illinois, on February22, 1989. She was raised in Columbus, Georgia, by her mother, Stephanie Adderley, an IT technician, and Phillip Adderley, a CEBAF lab technician. She attended Columbus High School. Before continuing her career in New York City at the American Musical and Dramatic Academy, she performed in several national stage productions and televisions commercials.

Career 
Mila Jam performed as the popular YouTube impersonator Britney Houston. She was known for creating parodies of popular videos and posting them on YouTube within days of the original videos' releases. She began creating her parodies while in the national touring company of Rent.

Several of her parodies have over a million hits, with her parody of Rihanna's song Umbrella having over two million. For her parody of the Pussycat Dolls' song When I Grow Up, Jam recruited four drag queens to serve as the "Britney Cat Dolls". She choreographed and starred in the 2008 MTV original television pilot Newsical, which was not picked up. She recorded the song "And The Crowd Goes", which was written and produced by Jonny McGovern and released on his compilation, The East Village Mixtape 2: The Legends Ball, and is working on an album of original material. The song also features NYC-based LGBTQ rapper Jipsta. Mila has toured internationally with the Broadway musical RENT, has performed alongside James Brown, Mark Ronson, Laverne Cox, Travis Wall, Jody Watley, Lady Kier(Deee-Lite) & Natasha Bedingfield. She has appeared on the BBC's The Lilly Allen Show, MTV and MTV NEWS, and featured in special articles in The Hugffington Post, Billboard, BOSSIP, MTV.com, OUT.com and Perezhilton.com. Mila has also been a frequent host of the original YouTube talk show series titled I’m From Driftwood.

Mila Jam's new video Faces was released to coincide with International Trans Day of Visibility and she was joined in the video by Laverne Cox, Tituss Burgess, Candis Cayne, model Geena Rocero, RuPaul's Drag Race's Peppermint, Transparent's Zackary Drucker, Trace Lysette and Zoolander's Nathan Lee Graham. The song has been called an anthem for the LGBTQ movement and focuses on one's self acceptance, inner beauty, and sense of belonging.

Awards
Mila was awarded Best Video and Dance Artist at the 2013 GLAM Nightlife Awards and she was named Odyssey Nightlife Awards Breakthrough Artist in 2015 .

Discography 
 "Walk" (2010)
 "This is Love" (2011)
 "Warrior" (2011)
 "Masters of the Universe" (2013)
 "Faces" (2017)

References 

Living people
1989 births
20th-century LGBT people
21st-century African-American women singers
21st-century LGBT people
American choreographers
American Internet celebrities
American LGBT singers
American Musical and Dramatic Academy alumni
LGBT African Americans
LGBT people from Georgia (U.S. state)
LGBT people from Illinois
LGBT YouTubers
Musicians from Columbus, Georgia
People from Aurora, Illinois
Transgender women musicians